The Communauté de communes du Sud-Artois is a communauté de communes, an intercommunal structure, in the Pas-de-Calais department, in the Hauts-de-France region, northern France. It was created in January 2013 by the merger of the former communautés de communes Région de Bapaume, canton de Bertincourt and Sud Arrageois (partly). Its area is 426.1 km2, and its population was 27,349 in 2018. Its seat is in Bapaume.

Composition
The communauté de communes consists of the following 64 communes:

Ablainzevelle
Achiet-le-Grand
Achiet-le-Petit
Avesnes-lès-Bapaume
Ayette
Bancourt
Bapaume
Barastre
Beaulencourt
Beaumetz-lès-Cambrai
Béhagnies
Bertincourt
Beugnâtre
Beugny
Biefvillers-lès-Bapaume
Bihucourt
Bucquoy
Bullecourt
Bus
Chérisy
Courcelles-le-Comte
Croisilles
Douchy-lès-Ayette
Écoust-Saint-Mein
Ervillers
Favreuil
Foncquevillers
Fontaine-lès-Croisilles
Frémicourt
Gomiécourt
Gommecourt
Grévillers
Hamelincourt
Haplincourt
Havrincourt
Hébuterne
Hermies
Lebucquière
Léchelle
Ligny-Thilloy
Martinpuich
Metz-en-Couture
Morchies
Morval
Mory
Moyenneville
Neuville-Bourjonval
Noreuil
Puisieux
Riencourt-lès-Bapaume
Rocquigny
Ruyaulcourt
Sailly-au-Bois
Saint-Léger
Sapignies
Le Sars
Souastre
Le Transloy
Trescault
Vaulx-Vraucourt
Vélu
Villers-au-Flos
Warlencourt-Eaucourt
Ytres

References

Commune communities in France
Intercommunalities of Pas-de-Calais